This list of the prehistoric life of Minnesota contains the various prehistoric life-forms whose fossilized remains have been reported from within the US state of Minnesota.

Precambrian
The Paleobiology Database records no known occurrences of Precambrian fossils in Minnesota.

Paleozoic

Selected Paleozoic taxa of Minnesota
 †Actinoceras
 †Actinodiscus
 †Amorphognathus
 †Armenoceras
  †Bothriocidaris
 †Bumastus
 †Bumastus orbicaudatus
 †Calymene
 †Cameroceras
 †Ceratopsis
 †Ceraurinella
 †Ceraurinus
 †Ceraurus
 †Charactoceras
 †Chasmatopora
 †Chidleyenoceras
 †Chirognathus
  †Cincinnetina
 †Cincinnetina minnesotensis – type locality for species
 †Constellaria
 †Cordylodus
 †Cotteroceras
 †Crania
 †Craniops
 †Culumbodina
 †Curtognathus
 †Cyclonema
 †Cyptendoceras
 †Cyrtolites
 †Diplograptus
 †Ellesmeroceras
  †Endoceras
 †Erratencrinurus
 †Fayettoceras – tentative report
 †Flexicalymene
 †Flexicalymene senaria
  †Gabriceraurus
 †Geisonoceras
 †Glyptocrinus
 †Gonioceras
 †Grewingkia
 †Hallopora
 †Helcionopsis
 †Hindia
 †Holopea
 †Hypseloconus – type locality for genus
 †Icriodus
 †Illaenus
  †Isotelus
 †Isotelus gigas
 †Kentlandoceras
  †Kionoceras
 †Kirengella
 †Krausella
 †Lambeoceras
 †Lingula
 †Manitoulinoceras
 †Michelinoceras
 †Nanno
 †Ormoceras – tentative report
 †Orthoceras
 †Oulodus
 †Ozarkodina
 †Periodon
 †Phragmolites
 †Plaesiomys
 †Platystrophia
 †Plectoceras
  †Pleurocystites
 †Polygnathus
 †Polygnathus linguiformis
 †Polygnathus parawebbi
 †Polygrammoceras
 †Pterotheca
 †Reedsoceras
 †Reteocrinus
 †Rigidella
 †Rioceras
  †Scenella
 †Scenella compressa
 †Scenella obtusa
 †Similodonta
 †Skenidioides
 †Sowerbyella
 †Spyroceras
 †Stigmatella
 †Strepsodiscus
  †Strophomena
 †Strophomena billingsi
 †Strophomena filitexta
 †Strophomena incurvata
 †Strophomena plattinensis – or unidentified comparable form
 †Subulites
 †Teichertoceras
 †Tryblidium
 †Ulrichoceras
  †Urasterella
 †Valcouroceras
 †Vellamo
 †Westonoceras
 †Whiteavesia
 †Zittelloceras

Mesozoic

 †Acanthoceras
  †Acteon
 †Acteon propinquus
 †Amphidonte – tentative report
 †Anatimya
 †Anatimya plicata
 Anatina
 †Anatina marblensis
 †Anchura
 †Anchura grouti
  †Anomia
 †Anomia propatoris
 Aporrhais
 †Aporrhais nuptialis
 †Arcellites
 †Arcellites disciformis
 †Ariadnaesporites
 †Ariadnaesporites varius
 Azolla – or unidentified comparable form
 Barbatia
 †Barbatia micronema
 Brachidontes
 †Brachidontes arcturusensis
 †Calliomphalus – tentative report
 †Calliomphalus colerainensis
  †Calycoceras – tentative report
  Carcharias
 †Carcharias amonensis
 †Cenocarcharias
 †Cenocarcharias tenuiplicatus
 †Collignoniceras
 †Collignoniceras percarinatum
 Coptothyris
 †Coptothyris dakotaensis
 Corbula
 †Corbula kanabensis
 †Costatheca
 †Cretodus
 †Cretodus semiplicatus
  †Cretolamna
 †Cretolamna appendiculata
 †Cymbophora
 †Cymbophora emmonsi
 †Cymbophora utahensis – tentative report
  †Dentalium
 Discradisca
 †Dunveganoceras
 †Dunveganoceras hagei
 †Epitonium
 †Etea – tentative report
  †Exogyra
 †Exogyra boveyensis
 †Exogyra lamellosa
 †Exogyra mesabiensis
 †Exogyra suborbiculata
 †Gervillia
 †Gervillia propleura – tentative report
 †Goolandia
 †Goolandia minnesotensis
 Granocardium
 †Granocardium enstromi
 Gyrodes
 †Gyrodes conradi
 †Hybodus
 †Hybodus rajkovichi – type locality for species
  †Inoceramus
 †Inoceramus apicalis
 †Inoceramus fragilis
 †Inoceramus mesabiensis
 †Ischyodus
 †Legumen
 †Legumen planulatum – or unidentified comparable form
 †Leptosolen
 †Leptosolen biplicatus
 Lima
 †Lima utahensis
  †Lingula
 †Lingula subspatulata – tentative report
 †Mesozoisynangia
 †Mesozoisynangia trilobus
 †Metengonoceras
 †Metengonoceras acutum
 †Metengonoceras dumblei – or unidentified comparable form
 †Metengonoceras dumbli
 †Metoicoceras
 †Metoicoceras bergquisti
 †Metoicoceras swallovi – or unidentified related form
 †Minerisporites
 †Minerisporites mirabilis
 †Molaspora
 †Molaspora rugosa
 †Mytiloides
 †Mytiloides labiatus
 †Mytiloides mytiloides
  Nerita – tentative report
 †Nerita minnesotensis
 Nucula
 †Nucula coloradoensis
  †Onchopristis
 †Onchopristis dunklei
  Ostrea
 †Ostrea gilei
 †Ostrea prudentia
 †Ostrea soleniscus
 †Ostrea staufferi
 Parapholas
 †Parapholas sphenoideus
 †Pecten
 †Pecten platessus
 Pholadomya
 †Pholadomya coloradensis
 †Pholadomya coloradoensis
 †Pinna
  †Placenticeras
 †Placenticeras pseudoplacenta
 Polinices
 †Polinices concinna
 †Prionocyclus
 †Prionocyclus novimexicanus
 †Protolamna
 †Protolamna gigantea – type locality for species
 †Pseudoperna
 †Pseudoperna congesta
 †Pteria
 †Pteria gastrodes
 Rostellaria
 †Rostellaria shumardi
 †Sanoarca
 †Sanoarca siouxensis
  †Scaphites
 †Scaphites corvensis
 †Scaphites preventricosus
 Serpula
 †Serpula bicarinata
 Siliqua
 †Siliqua huerfanensis
 †Spermatites
  Squalicorax
 †Squalicorax baharijensis
 Tapes (bivalve)
 †Tapes cyprimeriformis
 Tellina
 †Tellina calumetensis
 †Tenellisporites
 †Tenellisporites spinatus
 Teredolites – tentative report
  †Terminonaris
 †Terminonaris robusta – type locality for species
 †Volutoderma
 †Volutoderma dalli
 Vulsella
 †Watinoceras
 †Watinoceras coloradoense
 Yoldia
 †Yoldia calumetensis

Cenozoic

 Bison
 †Bison antiquus
 †Bison bison
 †Mammut
  †Mammut americanum
 †Mammuthus
 †Mammuthus columbi

References
 

Minnesota